The Academy Award for Best Director (officially known as the Academy Award of Merit for Directing) is an award presented annually by the Academy of Motion Picture Arts and Sciences (AMPAS). It is given in honor of a film director who has exhibited outstanding directing while working in the film industry.
The award is traditionally presented by the previous year's Best Director winner.

The 1st Academy Awards ceremony was held in 1929 with the award being split into "Dramatic" and "Comedy" categories; Frank Borzage and Lewis Milestone won for 7th Heaven and Two Arabian Knights, respectively. However, these categories were merged for all subsequent ceremonies. Nominees are determined by single transferable vote within the directors branch of AMPAS; winners are selected by a plurality vote from the entire eligible voting members of the academy.

For the first eleven years of the Academy Awards, directors were allowed to be nominated for multiple films in the same year. However, after the nomination of Michael Curtiz for two films, Angels with Dirty Faces and Four Daughters, at the 11th Academy Awards, the rules were revised so that an individual could only be nominated for one film at each ceremony. That rule has since been amended, although the only director who has received multiple nominations in the same year was Steven Soderbergh for Erin Brockovich and Traffic in 2000, winning the award for the latter. The Academy Awards for Best Director and Best Picture have been very closely linked throughout their history. Of the 88 films that won Best Picture and were also nominated for Best Director, 67 won the award.

Since its inception, the award has been given to 74 directors or directing teams. As of the 2023 ceremony, American filmmaking duo Daniels are the most recent winner in this category for their work on Everything Everywhere All at Once and the third duo to win after Robert Wise & Jerome Robbins (West Side Story) and the Coen Brothers (No Country for Old Men).

Winners and nominees
In the following table, the years are listed as per Academy convention, and generally correspond to the year of film release in Los Angeles County, California; the ceremonies are always held the following year. For the first five ceremonies, the eligibility period spanned twelve months from August 1 to July 31. For the 6th ceremony held in 1934, the eligibility period lasted from August 1, 1932, to December 31, 1933. Since the 7th ceremony held in 1935, the period of eligibility became the full previous calendar year from January 1 to December 31.

1920s

1930s

1940s

1950s

1960s

1970s

1980s

1990s

2000s

2010s

2020s

Multiple wins and nominations

Multiple wins

Four or more nominations

Age superlatives

Diversity of nominees/winners

Since its inception, it has been 467 nominations for the award and it has been given to 74 directors or directing teams. Six black directors have been nominated (John Singleton, Lee Daniels, Steve McQueen, Barry Jenkins, Jordan Peele and Spike Lee) a total of six times in this category, and none have won the award. Seven female directors have been nominated (Jane Campion, Chloé Zhao, Emerald Fennell, Greta Gerwig, Kathryn Bigelow, Sofia Coppola and Lina Wertmüller) a total of eight times in the category, and three have won the award. Nine Asian directors have been nominated (M. Night Shyamalan, Chloé Zhao, Lee Isaac Chung, Ryusuke Hamaguchi, Bong Joon-ho, Ang Lee, Hiroshi Teshigahara, Akira Kurosawa and Daniel Kwan) a total of eleven times in the category, with five wins total. Five Latin American directors have been nominated (Héctor Babenco, Fernando Meirelles, Alejandro González Iñárritu, Alfonso Cuarón and Guillermo del Toro) a total of eight times in the category, with five wins total.

Records 

 John Ford has received the most awards in this category with four.
 William Wyler was nominated on twelve occasions, more than any other individual.
 Clarence Brown received the most nominations without a win with six.
 Damien Chazelle became the youngest director in history to receive this award, at the age of 32 for his work on La La Land.
 John Singleton became the youngest and first black director to be nominated for this award, at age 24 for his work on Boyz n the Hood.
 Three directing teams have shared the award; Robert Wise and Jerome Robbins for West Side Story in 1961, Joel and Ethan Coen for No Country for Old Men in 2007, and Daniel Kwan and Daniel Scheinert for Everything Everywhere All at Once in 2022.
 Only five times in Academy Award history have director-collaborators been nominated for award: Robert Wise and Jerome Robbins for West Side Story (1961), Warren Beatty and Buck Henry for Heaven Can Wait (1978), Joel and Ethan Coen for No Country for Old Men (2007) and True Grit (2010), and Daniel Kwan and Daniel Scheinert for Everything Everywhere All at Once (2022).
 Only six times in Academy Award history did directors win the award for their feature film debut: Delbert Mann for Marty (1955), Jerome Robbins for West Side Story (1961), Robert Redford for Ordinary People (1980), James L. Brooks for Terms of Endearment (1983), Kevin Costner for Dances with Wolves and Sam Mendes for American Beauty (1999). 
 Jerome Robbins is the only winner in this category that only directed one feature film his entire life.
 The Coen brothers are the only siblings to have won the award. 
 Kathryn Bigelow is the first woman to have won the award, for 2009's The Hurt Locker.
Francis Ford Coppola for The Godfather Trilogy is the only director to be nominated for each film of a trilogy, winning one for the sequel.
John Ford (1940-1941), Joseph L. Mankiewicz (1949-1950), and Alejandro González Iñárritu (2014-2015) are the only three directors to have won back-to-back for this category.
Ang Lee is the first Asian director to have won the award. In 2012 he became the first Asian director to win twice.
Alfonso Cuarón became the first Mexican director (and Latin American) to have won the award for Gravity. He won again for Roma.
Chloé Zhao became the first woman of color to have won the award for Nomadland.

Notes

See also
 BAFTA Award for Best Direction
 Critics' Choice Movie Award for Best Director
 Directors Guild of America Award for Outstanding Directing – Feature Film
 Golden Globe Award for Best Director
 Independent Spirit Award for Best Director

References

Bibliography

External links
 Oscars.org (official Academy site)
 The Academy Awards Database (official site)
 Oscar.com (official ceremony promotional site)

Directing
 
 
Awards for best director